Farindola is a comune and town in the province of Pescara in the Abruzzo region of Italy. It is located in the Gran Sasso e Monti della Laga National Park.

History
As for Fara San Martino, the name of the village comes from the Lombard word for "borough", but various Palaeolithic findings point to an earlier origin. In the 11th century two important Benedictine monasteries occupied the area. Later on the village came under the control of the city of Penne and the Farnese family.

On the afternoon of 18 January 2017 the municipality was the scene of the Rigopiano avalanche when an avalanche struck the luxury resort Hotel Rigopiano, killing twenty-nine people and injuring eleven others.

References